The Carver Village Historic District is a historic district in Savannah, Georgia.  It was listed on the National Register of Historic Places in 2019.

The district is bounded by W. Gwinnett and Endley Sts., Allen Blun, and Collat Avenues.

Carver Village, named for George Washington Carver, was established in 1948 and provided affordable housing for blacks, including many who were in military service or who were veterans.  It includes about 600 houses, churches and other buildings.

Its pending nomination for National Register listing was celebrated in 2016, at a reception at the Historic Carver Village Neighborhood Center, 905 Collat Avenue.

It being listed on the National Register was also asserted in 2017.

References

External links
 

Historic districts on the National Register of Historic Places in Georgia (U.S. state)
National Register of Historic Places in Savannah, Georgia